Skara Cathedral is a church in the town of Skara, Sweden. The cathedral is the seat for the bishop of the Diocese of Skara of the Church of Sweden .

History
Its history is traced from the 10th century, but its current appearance in the Gothic style originated in the 13th century. The choir dates back to the early 13th century, whilst the transept and nave took shape a century later. The cathedral was damaged and restored on several occasions, making its current appearance rather modern. In the 1760s, it was given a baroque southern facade. The current Gothic Revival design dates to restorations in 1886–1894 under architect Helgo Zettervall (1831–1907). The previously flat twin towers were given pointed Gothic spires.

The 37 mosaic stained glass windows were created by the artist Bo Beskow (1906-1989) in cooperation with glazier Gustav Ringström between 1945 and 1976. The motifs are mostly biblical, but the two Swedish saints Bridget of Sweden and Helena of Skövde are also depicted. No windows from the medieval church have been preserved.

There are four bells in the two towers on the west side. The northern tower contains the large bell, cast in 1725 and enlarged in 1785, while three smaller bells hang in the southern tower.

The church has a medieval crypt that was found in 1949 after having been buried under stones since the 13th century. A grave, containing a skeleton, was found in the crypt, which is within the oldest (10th century) part of the cathedral. Some remains of the original 10th century structure can still be seen in the crypt.

Gallery

Notes

References

Other Sources

 Wideen, Harald (1993)  Skara Domkyrka, kort historik och vägledning (Stockholm: Kungl. Vetenskaps- och vitterhets-samhället) 
Beskow, Bo (1985)  Ny himmel, ny jord : en bok om Bo Beskows fönster i Skara domkyrka (Stockholm: Legenda)

External links
 Skara Domkyrka official website

Lutheran cathedrals in Sweden
Gothic architecture in Sweden
Roman Catholic cathedrals in pre-Reformation Sweden
Churches in Västra Götaland County
Churches in the Diocese of Skara